Mónica Filipa Grilo Gonçalves is a Portuguese football striker, currently playing for UE L'Estartit in the Spanish First Division. She has also played for Odivelas FC, SU 1º de Dezembro (Portugal) and Sporting Huelva (Spain).

She is a member of the Portuguese national team.

References

1988 births
Living people
Portuguese women's footballers
Portuguese expatriate sportspeople in Spain
Expatriate women's footballers in Spain
UE L'Estartit players
Primera División (women) players
Sporting de Huelva players
Portugal women's international footballers
Women's association football midfielders
Sportspeople from Setúbal